Onychium japonicum is a species of fern in the family Pteridaceae.

Taxonomy
The species was first described in 1784 by Carl Peter Thunberg as Trichomanes japonicum. In 1825, Blume used the name "Onychium" for a genus of orchids, but this was illegitimate since it had been used in 1820 for the fern genus. Blume also used the combination "Onychium japonicum" for an orchid (now Dendrobium moniliforme). In 1848,  Kunze transferred Trichomanes japonicum to the fern genus Onychium as Onychium japonicum. The name Onychium japonicum (Thunb.) Kunze is conserved against Onychium japonicum Blume.

References

Pteridaceae
Plants described in 1784